2 Timothy 3 is the third chapter of the Second Epistle to Timothy in the New Testament of the Christian Bible. The letter is traditionally attributed to Paul the Apostle, the last one written in Rome before his death (c. 64 or 67), addressed to Timothy. However, most biblical scholars believe that it and the other Pastoral Epistles are the work of an anonymous follower, writing after Paul's death in the first century AD. This chapter contains the charge to Timothy to keep out of heterodoxy, and use Paul's steadfast faith under persecution as an example to contrast the opponents' characters, while continue to follow the teachings of the Scriptures.

Text
The original text was written in Koine Greek. This chapter is divided into 17 verses.

Textual witnesses
Some early manuscripts containing the text of this chapter are:
Codex Sinaiticus (AD 330–360)
Codex Alexandrinus (400–440)
Codex Ephraemi Rescriptus (c. 450; complete)
Codex Freerianus (c. 450; extant verses 6–8; 16–17)
Codex Claromontanus (c. 550)

The heresy in Ephesus in prophetic perspective (3:1–9)
Paul paints a picture of the false teachers as 'actual deviants from the norm established by his gospel' and, as a result, endanger the faith of themselves and their followers.

The way of following Paul (3:10–17)
In this section Paul instructs Timothy to commit to Paul's teaching, as Timothy already shared many experiences with Paul, and urge him to 'accept the mantle of the Pauline mission'.

Verse 16
All Scripture is God-breathed and is useful for teaching, rebuking, correcting and training in righteousness,

"God-breathed" (Greek:): can be rendered as "given by inspiration of God". The Syriac version renders it "written by the Spirit", the Ethiopian version: "by the Spirit of God". All Scripture (Towner renders it: "every [text of] Scripture"

Verse 17
so that the servant of God may be thoroughly equipped for every good work.
The thoroughness in preparation for the work of God is significantly stressed and applicable for every Christian workers although the term 
the man of God narrowly can be interpreted for Christian teachers.

See also
 Antioch
 Iconium
 Jambres
 Jesus Christ
 Lystra
 Moses
 Related Bible parts: Matthew 24, Romans 5, 1 Timothy 4

References

Sources

External links
 King James Bible - Wikisource
English Translation with Parallel Latin Vulgate
Online Bible at GospelHall.org (ESV, KJV, Darby, American Standard Version, Bible in Basic English)
Multiple bible versions at Bible Gateway (NKJV, NIV, NRSV etc.)

03